The 2021 Houston Astros season was the 60th season for the Major League Baseball (MLB) franchise in Houston, Texas, their 57th as the Astros, ninth in both the American League (AL) and AL West division, and 22nd at Minute Maid Park.

Four Astros players gained selection to the 2021 All-Star Game, tied for the second most from any team in baseball.  The four were second baseman José Altuve, shortstop Carlos Correa, outfielder Michael Brantley, and relief pitcher Ryan Pressly, although none of them participated in the game.  First baseman Yuli Gurriel won the AL batting title, his first, with a .319 batting average, becoming the second Cuban-born player and second Astro to do so.  Correa led AL position players with 7.2 Wins Above Replacement (WAR).

The Astros concluded the regular season with a 95–67 record, while clinching an AL West division title for the fourth time in the last five seasons, as well as their sixth playoff berth in seven years.  By winning the AL West, Dusty Baker became the first manager in major league history to guide five different clubs to a division title, giving him eight division titles overall.

In the playoffs, the Astros defeated the Chicago White Sox in the American League Division Series (ALDS) in four games to advance to their fifth straight American League Championship Series (ALCS).  They faced the Boston Red Sox in a rematch of the 2018 ALCS.  The Astros won the ALCS in six games to advance to the World Series for the third time in five years.  It was the Astros' fourth pennant in franchise history and their third as an AL team. They lost in the World Series to the Atlanta Braves in six games.

Following the season, Yuli Gurriel and Carlos Correa won their first Gold Glove Awards, and the Astros were named the American League Gold Glove Team. Correa also won his first Platinum Glove Award and his first Fielding Bible Award. An American League (and franchise) record five Astros were named Gold Glove finalists, along with another five as finalists for the Silver Slugger Award. Dusty Baker and Luis García were named finalists for the AL Manager of the Year and AL Rookie of the Year awards, respectively. Baker finished third in voting, and García finished second. This marked the third consecutive season that an Astros player was named a finalist for the AL Rookie of the Year Award, following Yordan Álvarez, who won it unanimously in 2019, and Cristian Javier, who finished in third in 2020.

Additionally, Álvarez and Kyle Tucker were both selected for 2021's All-MLB Second Team.

Offseason

Summary
The Astros entered the 2021 Major League Baseball (MLB) season as having been defeated by the Tampa Bay Rays in seven games in the American League Championship Series (ALCS) and runner-up for the 2020 AL pennant.  The Astros played to a 3–0 deficit to begin the ALCS, won the next three, and were defeated 4–2 in Game 7.  The Rays thus avoided joining the 2004 New York Yankees as the only MLB clubs to lose a League Championship Series after mounting a 3–0 lead.

Ace starting pitcher Justin Verlander missed the entire 2021 season recuperating from ulnar collateral ligament reconstruction surgery, also known as Tommy John surgery, which was performed on October 1, 2020.  He was in the final year of his contract.  On February 27, 2021, the Astros placed the right-hander on the 60-day injured list as he continued to recover from the surgery.

Offseason transactions

Free agent signings
 Signed right-handed pitcher (RHP) Ryne Stanek to a 1-year contract on January 7, 2021 
 Signed RHP Pedro Báez to a 2-year contract on January 13, 2021 
 Signed catcher (C) Jason Castro to a 2-year contract on January 22, 2021
 Signed RHP Jake Odorizzi to a 2-year contract on March 8, 2021

Free agent departures
 Outfielder (OF) George Springer signed a six-year contract with the Toronto Blue Jays on January 23, 2021.
 OF Josh Reddick signed a minor league contract with the Arizona Diamondbacks on April 12, 2021.

Pitchers that elected for free agency included Joe Biagini, Chase De Jong, Roberto Osuna, Brad Peacock, Chris Devenski, and Dustin Garneau

Trades and waiver claims
Players that were traded or claimed in the offseason by a different team included Brandon Bailey, Humberto Castellanos, Cionel Pérez, Carlos Sanabria, Cy Sneed, and Jack Mayfield.

Contract extensions
 Signed RHP Lance McCullers Jr. to a five-year contract extension on March 24, 2021

Regular season

Summary

April

On April 1, starting pitcher Zack Greinke earned his first career Opening Day win, and 209th win overall, as the Astros defeated the Oakland Athletics, 8–1, at the Oakland Coliseum.  He pitched six scoreless innings, the 65th time his career he has produced at least six scoreless innings.  Yordan Álvarez, returning from dual knee surgery that cost him nearly all of the 2020 season, drove in three runners, and Michael Brantley and Alex Bregman hit back-to-back home runs in the eighth inning.  Outfielder Chas McCormick made his MLB debut as a defensive replacement for Brantley.  It was the Astros' ninth consecutive Opening Day win, a club record, and equalled the modern era (since 1900) major league record for the longest streak, with the Seattle Mariners (2007–15), Cincinnati Reds (1983–91), New York Mets (1975–83) and St. Louis Browns (1937–45).

Ryan Pressly first became Houston's full-time closer in 2021.

Brantley batted .345 in April and .410 in June, remaining at or near the top of the AL batting leaders for much of the season.

Manager Dusty Baker earned his 1,900th career win in the major leagues on April 22 by an 8–2 score versus the Los Angeles Angels.  In that game, Cristian Javier became the first Astros pitcher to record the first eight outs of a game by strikeout since Jim Deshaies on September 23, 1986, versus the Los Angeles Dodgers.  Over five innings, Javier set a new personal high with nine strikeouts and one walk and no earned runs.

In their first rematch since the 2020 American League Championship Series (ALCS), the Astros defeated the Tampa Bay Rays, 9–2, on April 30.  Lance McCullers Jr. hurled seven shutout innings, striking out nine.  Brantley and Carlos Correa both had four hits and Bregman hit a two-run home run.  Four RBI came via Aledmys Díaz' two hits.  Brantley, Bregman, Álvarez and Correa produced consecutive hits in the third inning, leading to three of the runs.  With this win, Baker reached 1,906 to pass Casey Stengel for 12th all-time.

May
Outfielder Kyle Tucker recorded a breakout season in 2021: from May 1 through the end of the season, he batted .320 and led the AL in on-base percentage, slugging and OPS.

During the May 7 game versus the Toronto Blue Jays, designated hitter Yordan Álvarez drove in the 100th run of his career, doing so in 114 game as part of a 10–4 victory.  He was the seventh-fastest player to reach 100 RBI in league history and the fastest to do so since the expansion era started in 1961.  The next game, he homered and drove in three more in an 8–4 loss to the Blue Jays for 103 RBI in 115 games.

In the May 25 contest versus the Los Angeles Dodgers, Greinke became the 135th pitcher in major league history to reach 3,000 career innings.  José Altuve was hitless in four at bats to end a 17-game hitting streak, the longest in the major leagues to that point in the season.

June
On June 4, Zack Greinke threw his first complete game since April 19, 2017, and first as a member of the Astros.  He allowed six hits with one run and one walk and three strikeouts in a 13–1 win over the Toronto Blue Jays at Sahlen Field in Buffalo, New York.  Martín Maldonado hit a grand slam, and Carlos Correa homered twice to lead the Astros' 16-hit attack.

In the June 6 contest versus the Blue Jays, infielder Aledmys Díaz suffered a fracture in his left hand on a hit by pitch delivered from Ross Stripling.  Díaz was expected to miss six to eight weeks.

On June 15, José Altuve hit a walk-off grand slam against the Texas Rangers.  The next day, he continued with a lead-off home run against Texas; Altuve is the first player in major league history to have a walk-off grand slam and then a lead-off home run in the following game.  The Astros won that game, 8–4, to sweep their in-state rivals and realize their 12th win in their past 16th games.  Third baseman Alex Bregman injured his left quadriceps in the first inning of the June 16 game as he attempted to avoid hitting into a double play.  Catcher Garrett Stubbs was recalled from Triple-A Sugar Land to take his place on the 25-man roster.

Altuve hit his 150th career home run on June 23, served up by Thomas Eshelman of the Baltimore Orioles.

All-Star Game selections
The following Astros players were selected as reserves to play at the 91st All-Star Game, hosted by the Colorado Rockies at Coors Field on July 13, 2021:
 José Altuve, second baseman: seventh selection, tied Craig Biggio for most appearances by an Astro
 Michael Brantley, outfielder: had batted .402 with nine doubles, one triple and 16 RBI in a one-month span since returning from injury
 Carlos Correa: shortstop: ranked fifth in AL in OPS (.926) at time of selection
 Ryan Pressly, relief pitcher: second selection.  Pressly had not allowed an earned run in 12 consecutive appearances, leading to a 1.54 ERA over 35 innings and a 4–1 record.  He was tied for first in save percentage (93.3%), and among relief pitchers in the AL, was third in ERA, fourth in WHIP (0.83) and hed tied for fifth in with 14 saves.

With the four total selections, the Astros tied for second-most selections for 2021.

July
A lingering knee injury dampened Brantley's second-half performance.  As of late July, he maintained a batting average of .336.

In an attempt to revamp their bullpen by adding higher-velocity pitchers, the Astros acquired Yimi García from the Miami Marlins on July 28.  Up until that trade, García saved 15 games with a 3.47 ERA over 39 total relief appearances in 2021.  He struck out 35 in  innings.  The Astros sent outfielder Bryan De La Cruz and pitcher Austin Pruitt in return.

On July 30, the Astros traded Myles Straw to the Cleveland Indians for reliever Phil Maton and minor league catcher Yainer Díaz.  Trading Straw allowed for the Astros to give rookie outfielders Chas McCormick and Jake Meyers more opportunities to play.  On July 31, the club selected Meyers' contract from Sugar Land and promoted him to the major league roster.

August
Jake Meyers made his Major League debut on August 1 as a pinch hitter in the ninth inning of a 5–3 loss to the San Francisco Giants.

Jake Meyers hit his first career home run on August 14 versus pitcher Jaime Barría of the Los Angeles Angels, and added a grand slam later in the same game as the Astros won, 8–2.

Third baseman Alex Bregman returned from left quadriceps strain on August 25 after missing over two months.  He scoring the winning run versus the Kansas City Royals on the day of his return, capping a 6–5, 10-inning score.

September and October
José Siri made his major league debut on September 3 as a pinch runner in the ninth inning versus the San Diego Padres.  Jake Meyers promptly hit a single that scored Siri from second base to give Siri his first run as a major leaguer.

Siri made his first start in the majors on September 13, playing left field and facing the Texas Rangers.  He went 4-for-5 with two home runs and five runs batted in to power a 15–1 rout at Globe Life Field.  He is the first player since the RBI statistic became official in 1920 to have that many RBI along with multiple home runs in their first major league start.  Yordan Álvarez added two home runs, including his 30th of the season; at the age of 24, he is the second Astro to hit 30 home runs in a season at that age after Alex Bregman, who hit 31 in 2018.

In the September 17 contest versus the Arizona Diamondbacks, José Altuve homered off Madison Bumgarner at Minute Maid Park to collect his 849th career hit in the stadium.  The hit tied him with Lance Berkman for most by an Astro in the venue.  He then passed Berkman the next night with a double.

On September 21, Carlos Correa scored his 100th run on the season to become the first Astros shortstop to score 100 runs in a season.

During the final road trip of the season, twenty-seven members of the team paid homage to veteran pitcher Zack Greinke, known for his leisurely dress style.  They wore fishing shirts, short shorts, and bucket hats.  Lance McCullers Jr. also brought in a bag of groceries from Whole Foods – as is Greinke's habit to fill his locker – as replenishment for their upcoming flight.  Greinke, who is from Florida, wore a bright orange Tampa Bay Buccaneers hat, an oversized fishing shirt, and shorts.  Martín Maldonado donned his own bright orange hat.  With Greinke posing with his new cadre of imitators, the team posted photos of their amusement on Instagram.  The team had chosen to honor the pitcher, in the final year of his contract, after a 7–6 win over the Arizona Diamondbacks in which had allowed five runs over four innings, raising his ERA on the season to 4.11.

On September 23, Álvarez drove in two runs on a home run in the first inning against Los Angeles Angels to score his 100th RBI of the season.  He was the second-youngest Astro to reach 100 RBI in one season, trailing César Cedeño, who did so at the age of 23 in 1974.  It was a 9–5 win.  Ryan Pressly completed a scoreless ninth in his 60th appearance of the season in this game, concluding the final condition for his contract for 2022 to fully vest.  He would earn a guaranteed $10 million.  Since being acquired by Houston at the 2018 trade deadline, Pressly had produced a 2.19 ERA, 0.924 WHIP, and saved 42 games in  innings.  He had converted 25 of 27 save chances on the season.

On September 28, the Astros won 4–3 against the Tampa Bay Rays on consecutive walks with the bases loaded, which was the first time they had done so in team history and only the eighth time in Major League Baseball history since 1931.  The Astros clinched the AL West on September 30 with a win over Tampa Bay at Minute Maid Park for their fourth division title in five seasons.  It was Houston's tenth division title and 15th postseason entrance.  For the first time in franchise history, the Astros gained a postseason berth for the fifth consecutive season.  With a combined record of 432–272 (.614) since 2017, Houston had attained the most wins in the major leagues in that span.  Manager Dusty Baker secured his eighth division title while becoming the first manager to guide five different clubs to a division title.  It was Baker's 11th career postseason appearance.

In the final game of the 2021 regular season, Yuli Gurriel hit a walk-off single to score Jason Castro and defeat the Oakland Athletics.  With that hit, his batting average stood at .319 to lead teammate Michael Brantley and Vladimir Guerrero Jr. of the Toronto Blue Jays (both hit .311) for the AL batting championship.  At age 37, Gurriel was the sixth-oldest player to win a batting title, the oldest to win their first batting title since Barry Bonds in 2002, and the first Cuban-born player since Tony Oliva in 1971.  Brantley, continuing to produce through lingering knee pain, saw 39 at bats in September.  It was the sixth time in his career he had finished in the top 10 in the AL in batting.

Over the final month of the season, right fielder Kyle Tucker batted .346 with eight home runs, 20 runs scored, 19 RBI, .438 on-base percentage, and .692 slugging percentage for a 1.130 OPS.  He was awarded AL Player of the Month for September, his first career monthly award.

Season standings

American League West

American League Wild Card

Astros team leaders

 Minimum 3.1 plate appearances per team games played
AVG qualified batters: Altuve, Álvarez, Brantley, Correa, Gurriel, Tucker

 Minimum 1 inning pitched per team games played
ERA and WHIP qualified pitchers: Greinke, McCullers Jr.

Record against opponents

Game log 

|- style="background:#bfb;"
| 1 || April 1 || @ Athletics || 8–1 || Greinke (1–0) || Bassitt (0–1) || — || 10,436 || 1–0 || W1
|- style="background:#bfb;"
| 2 || April 2 || @ Athletics || 9–5 || Abreu (1–0) || Luzardo (0–1) || — || 5,446 || 2–0 || W2
|- style="background:#bfb;"
| 3 || April 3 || @ Athletics || 9–1 || McCullers Jr. (1–0) || Irvin (0–1) || Raley (1) || 5,803 || 3–0 || W3
|- style="background:#bfb;"
| 4 || April 4 || @ Athletics || 9–2 || Bielak (1–0) || Manaea (0–1) || — || 4,504 || 4–0 || W4
|- style="background:#fbb;"
| 5 || April 5 || @ Angels || 6–7 || Watson (1–0) || Smith (0–1) || Mayers (1) || 13,447 || 4–1 || L1
|- style="background:#bfb;"
| 6 || April 6 || @ Angels || 4–2 || Pressly (1–0) || Iglesias (1–1) || — || 11,122 || 5–1 || W1
|- style="background:#bfb;"
| 7 || April 8 || Athletics || 6–2 || Javier (1–0) || Irvin (0–2) || — || 21,765 || 6–1 || W2
|- style="background:#fbb;"
| 8 || April 9 || Athletics || 2–6 || Petit (2–0) || Abreu (1–1) || — || 21,768 || 6–2 || L1
|- style="background:#fbb;"
| 9 || April 10 || Athletics || 3–7 || Montas (1–1) || Urquidy (0–1) || — || 21,760 || 6–3 || L2
|- style="background:#fbb;"
| 10 || April 12 || Tigers || 2–6 || Mize (1–0) || Greinke (1–1) || — || 15,779 || 6–4 || L3
|- style="background:#fbb;"
| 11 || April 13 || Tigers || 2–8 || Boyd (2–1) || Odorizzi (0–1) || — || 17,080 || 6–5 || L4
|- style="background:#fbb;"
| 12 || April 14 || Tigers || 4–6 || Fulmer (1–0) || McCullers Jr. (1–1) || Garcia (2) || 14,720 || 6–6 || L5
|- style="background:#fbb;"
| 13 || April 16 || @ Mariners || 5–6 || Misiewicz (2–0) || Stanek (0–1) || — || 8,967 || 6–7 || L6
|- style="background:#bfb;"
| 14 || April 17 || @ Mariners || 1–0 || Greinke (2–1) || Flexen (1–1) || Pressly (1) || 8,960 || 7–7 || W1
|- style="background:#fbb;"
| 15 || April 18 || @ Mariners || 2–7 || Newsome (1–0) || Odorizzi (0–2) || — || 8,959 || 7–8 || L1
|- style="background:#fbb;"
| 16 || April 20 || @ Rockies || 2–6 || Gray (2–1) || L. García (0–1) || — || 10,144 || 7–9 || L2
|- style="background:#fbb;"
| 17 || April 21 || @ Rockies || 3–6 || Gomber (1–2) || Urquidy (0–2) || — || 7,120 || 7–10 || L3
|- style="background:#bfb;"
| 18 || April 22 || Angels || 8–2 || Javier (2–0) || Cobb (1–1) || — || 13,985 || 8–10 || W1
|- style="background:#bfb;"
| 19 || April 23 || Angels || 5–4  || Pressly (2–0) || Iglesias (1–2) || — || 21,728 || 9–10 || W2
|- style="background:#bfb;"
| 20 || April 24 || Angels || 16–2 || Emanuel (1–0) || Canning (1–2) || — || 21,820 || 10–10 || W3
|- style="background:#fbb;"
| 21 || April 25 || Angels || 2–4 || Rodriguez (1–0) || L. García (0–2) || Iglesias (3) || 21,781 || 10–11 || L1
|- style="background:#bfb;"
| 22 || April 26 || Mariners || 5–2 || Urquidy (1–2) || Sheffield (1–2) || Pressly (2) || 11,862 || 11–11 || W1
|- style="background:#bfb;"
| 23 || April 27 || Mariners || 2–0 || Javier (3–0) || Gonzales (1–3) || Pressly (3) || 14,413 || 12–11 || W2
|- style="background:#bfb;"
| 24 || April 28 || Mariners || 7–5 || Smith (1–1) || Montero (2–1) || Stanek (1) || 12,707 || 13–11 || W3
|- style="background:#fbb;"
| 25 || April 29 || Mariners || 0–1 || Kikuchi (1–1) || L. García (0–3) || Graveman (3) || 14,149 || 13–12 || L1
|- style="background:#bfb;"
| 26 || April 30 || @ Rays || 9–2 || McCullers Jr. (2–1) || Yarbrough (1–3) || — || 6,169 || 14–12 || W1
|-

|- style="background:#bfb;"
| 27 || May 1 || @ Rays || 3–1 || Urquidy (2–2) || Fleming (1–3) || Pressly (4) || 7,335 || 15–12 || W2
|- style="background:#fbb;"
| 28 || May 2 || @ Rays || 4–5 || Springs (2–0) || Raley (0–1) || Castillo (7) || 6,933 || 15–13 || L1
|- style="background:#fbb;"
| 29 || May 4 || @ Yankees || 3–7 || Luetge (2–0) || Bielak (1–1) || — || 10,850 || 15–14 || L2
|- style="background:#fbb;"
| 30 || May 5 || @ Yankees || 3–6 || Loáisiga (3–1) || Raley (0–2) || Chapman (7) || 9,895 || 15–15 || L3
|- style="background:#bfb;"
| 31 || May 6 || @ Yankees || 7–4 || Scrubb (1–0) || Green (0–3) || Pressly (5) || 10,042 || 16–15 || W1
|- style="background:#bfb;"
| 32 || May 7 || Blue Jays || 10–4 || Urquidy (3–2) || Stripling (0–2) || — || 25,410 || 17–15 || W2
|- style="background:#fbb;"
| 33 || May 8 || Blue Jays || 4–8 || Matz (5–2) || Javier (3–1) || — || 25,794 || 17–16 || L1
|- style="background:#bfb;"
| 34 || May 9 || Blue Jays || 7–4 || Abreu (2–1) || Pearson (0–1) || Pressly (6) || 24,355 || 18–16 || W1
|- style="background:#fbb;"
| 35 || May 10 || Angels || 4–5 || Suárez (1–0) || Bielak (1–2) || Iglesias (6) || 13,695 || 18–17 || L1
|- style="background:#bfb;"
| 36 || May 11 || Angels || 5–1 || McCullers Jr. (3–1) || Slegers (2–1) || — || 17,350 || 19–17 || W1
|- style="background:#bfb;"
| 37 || May 12 || Angels || 9–1 || Bielak (2–2) || Heaney (1–3) || — || 13,668 || 20–17 || W2
|- style="background:#bfb;"
| 38 || May 13 || Rangers || 4–3  || Raley (1–2) || Martin (0–1) || — || 16,340 || 21–17 || W3
|- style="background:#bfb;"
| 39 || May 14 || Rangers || 10–4 || Greinke (3–1) || Benjamin (0–2) || — || 24,495 || 22–17 || W4
|- style="background:#bfb;"
| 40 || May 15 || Rangers || 6–5 || L. García (1–3) || Dunning (2–3) || Pressly (7) || 25,858 || 23–17 || W5
|- style="background:#bfb;"
| 41 || May 16 || Rangers || 6–2 || Raley (2–2) || Rodríguez (1–2) || — || 26,069 || 24–17 || W6
|- style="background:#fbb;"
| 42 || May 18 || @ Athletics || 5–6 || Petit (5–0) || Abreu (2–2) || — || 4,838 || 24–18 || L1
|- style="background:#bfb;"
| 43 || May 19 || @ Athletics || 8–1 || Greinke (4–1) || Montas (5–3) || — || 3,925 || 25–18 || W1
|- style="background:#bfb;"
| 44 || May 20 || @ Athletics || 8–4 || L. García (2–3) || Irvin (3–5) || — || 4,562 || 26–18 || W2
|- style="background:#fbb;"
| 45 || May 21 || @ Rangers || 5–7  || Hearn (2–1) || Abreu (2–3) || — || 30,445 || 26–19 || L1
|- style="background:#fbb;"
| 46 || May 22 || @ Rangers || 4–8 || Allard (1–0) || Scrubb (1–1) || — || 38,055 || 26–20 || L2
|- style="background:#fbb;"
| 47 || May 23 || @ Rangers || 2–3  || King (5–3) || Pressly (2–1) || — || 36,444 || 26–21 || L3
|- style="background:#fbb;"
| 48 || May 25 || Dodgers || 2–9 || Kershaw (7–3) || Greinke (4–2) || — || 34,443 || 26–22 || L4
|- style="background:#bfb;"
| 49 || May 26 || Dodgers || 5–2 || L. García (3–3) || Bauer (5–3) || Abreu (1) || 30,939 || 27–22 || W1
|- style="background:#fbb;"
| 50 || May 28 || Padres || 3–10  || Melancon (1–0) || Raley (2–3) || — || 32,045 || 27–23 || L1
|- style="background:#fbb;"
| 51 || May 29 || Padres || 8–11  || Adams (2–0) || Garza (0–1) || Díaz (1) || 31,323 || 27–24 || L2
|- style="background:#bfb;"
| 52 || May 30 || Padres || 7–4 || Greinke (5–2) || Snell (1–2) || — || 29,019 || 28–24 || W1
|- style="background:#bfb;"
| 53 || May 31 || Red Sox || 11–2 || Urquidy (4–2) || Rodríguez (5–4) || — || 28,543 || 29–24 || W2
|-

|- style="background:#bfb;"
| 54 || June 1 || Red Sox || 5–1 || L. García (4–3) || Richards (4–4) || — || 23,449 || 30–24 || W3
|- style="background:#bfb;"
| 55 || June 2 || Red Sox || 2–1 || Valdez (1–0) || Pivetta (6–1) || Pressly (8) || 22,664 || 31–24 || W4
|- style="background:#fbb;"
| 56 || June 3 || Red Sox || 1–5 || Pérez (4–2) || Odorizzi (0–3) || — || 24,853 || 31–25 || L1
|- style="background:#bfb;"
| 57 || June 4 || @ Blue Jays || 13–1 || Greinke (6–2) || Ryu (5–3) || — || 5,510 || 32–25 || W1
|- style="background:#fbb;"
| 58 || June 5 || @ Blue Jays || 2–6 || Stripling (2–3) || Urquidy (4–3) || — || 5,327 || 32–26 || L1
|- style="background:#bfb;"
| 59 || June 6 || @ Blue Jays || 6–3 || L. García (5–3) || Matz (6–3) || Pressly (9) || 5,404 || 33–26 || W1
|- style="background:#bfb;"
| 60 || June 8 || @ Red Sox || 7–1 || Valdez (2–0) || Pérez (4–3) || — || 23,604 || 34–26 || W2
|- style="background:#bfb;"
| 61 || June 9 || @ Red Sox || 8–3 || Odorizzi (1–3) || Eovaldi (7–3) || Javier (1) || 21,007 || 35–26 || W3
|- style="background:#fbb;"
| 62 || June 10 || @ Red Sox || 8–12 || Hernández (1–2) || Taylor (0–1) || — || 23,378 || 35–27 || L1
|- style="background:#bfb;"
| 63 || June 11 || @ Twins || 6–4 || Stanek (1–1) || Shoemaker (2–8) || Pressly (10) || 17,223 || 36–27 || W1
|- style="background:#fbb;"
| 64 || June 12 || @ Twins || 2–5 || Berríos (7–2) || L. García (5–4) || Rogers (6) || 18,767 || 36–28 || L1
|- style="background:#bfb;"
| 65 || June 13 || @ Twins || 14–3 || Valdez (3–0) || Pineda (3–4) || — || 19,147 || 37–28 || W1
|- style="background:#bfb;"
| 66 || June 15 || Rangers || 6–3  || Pressly (3–1) || Evans (0–2) || — || 26,379 || 38–28 || W2
|- style="background:#bfb;"
| 67 || June 16 || Rangers || 8–4 || Greinke (7–2) || Lyles (2–5) || — || 22,735 || 39–28 || W3
|- style="background:#bfb;"
| 68 || June 17 || White Sox || 10–2 || Urquidy (5–3) || Cease (5–3) || — || 21,795 || 40–28 || W4
|- style="background:#bfb;"
| 69 || June 18 || White Sox || 2–1 || Pressly (4–1) || Crochet (2–3) || — || 30,898 || 41–28 || W5
|- style="background:#bfb;"
| 70 || June 19 || White Sox || 7–3 || Valdez (4–0) || Lynn (7–3) || — || 35,210 || 42–28 || W6
|- style="background:#bfb;"
| 71 || June 20 || White Sox || 8–2 || McCullers Jr. (4–1) || Keuchel (6–2) || — || 39,821 || 43–28 || W7
|- style="background:#bfb;"
| 72 || June 21 || @ Orioles || 10–2 || Odorizzi (2–3) || Akin (0–3) || — || 7,414 || 44–28 || W8
|- style="background:#bfb;"
| 73 || June 22 || @ Orioles || 3–1 || Greinke (8–2) || López (2–9) || Pressly (11) || 8,510 || 45–28 || W9
|- style="background:#bfb;"
| 74 || June 23 || @ Orioles || 13–0 || Urquidy (6–3) || Eshelman (0–1) || — || 10,013 || 46–28 || W10
|- style="background:#bfb;"
| 75 || June 24 || @ Tigers || 12–3 || L. García (6–4) || Ureña (2–8) || — || 12,656 || 47–28 || W11
|- style="background:#bbb;"
| — || June 25 || @ Tigers || colspan=7| PPD, RAIN; rescheduled for Jun 26 
|- style="background:#fbb;"
| 76 || June 26  || @ Tigers || 1–3  || Mize (5–4) || Valdez (4–1) || Cisnero (3) || 12,422 || 47–29 || L1
|- style="background:#bfb;"
| 77 || June 26  || @ Tigers || 3–2  || McCullers Jr. (5–1) || Fulmer (4–4) || Pressly (12) || 13,950 || 48–29 || W1
|- style="background:#fbb;"
| 78 || June 27 || @ Tigers || 1–2  || Soto (4–1) || Taylor (0–2) || — || 13,532 || 48–30 || L1
|- style="background:#fbb;"
| 79 || June 28 || Orioles || 7–9 || Fry (2–2) || Bielak (2–3) || Plutko (1) || 24,419 || 48–31 || L2
|- style="background:#fbb;"
| 80 || June 29 || Orioles || 3–13 || Wells (1–0) || Garza (0–2) || Tate (1) || 30,346 || 48–32 || L3
|- style="background:#fbb;"
| 81 || June 30 || Orioles || 2–5 || Scott (3–3) || L. García (6–5) || Sulser (3) || 28,124 || 48–33 || L4
|-

|- style="background:#bfb;"
| 82 || July 1 || @ Indians || 7–2 || Valdez (5–1) || Mejía (1–3) || — || 13,772 || 49–33 || W1
|- style="background:#bfb;"
| 83 || July 2 || @ Indians || 6–3 || McCullers Jr. (6–1) || Hentges (1–3) || Pressly (13) || 24,337 || 50–33 || W2
|- style="background:#bfb;"
| 84 || July 3 || @ Indians || 3–2 || Odorizzi (3–3) || Morgan (1–3) || Pressly (14) || 24,961 || 51–33 || W3
|- style="background:#bfb;"
| 85 || July 4 || @ Indians || 4–3  || Taylor (1–2) || Clase (3–3) || Raley (2) || 17,412 || 52–33 || W4
|- style="background:#bfb;"
| 86 || July 6 || Athletics || 9–6 || Abreu (3–3) || Wendelken (1–1) || Pressly (15) || 26,353 || 53–33 || W5
|- style="background:#bfb;"
| 87 || July 7 || Athletics || 4–3 || Taylor (2–2) || Manaea (6–6) || Pressly (16) || 21,150 || 54–33 || W6
|- style="background:#fbb;"
| 88 || July 8 || Athletics || 1–2 || Montas (8–7) || McCullers Jr. (6–2) || Diekman (7) || 29,243 || 54–34 || L1
|- style="background:#fbb;"
| 89 || July 9 || Yankees || 0–4 || Luetge (3–1) || Odorizzi (3–4) || — || 40,857 || 54–35 || L2
|- style="background:#fbb;"
| 90 || July 10 || Yankees || 0–1 || Cole (9–4) || Greinke (8–3) || — || 41,259 || 54–36 || L3
|- style="background:#bfb;"
| 91 || July 11 || Yankees || 8–7 || Garza Jr. (1–2) || Green (3–5) || — || 37,928 || 55–36 || W1
|- style="background:#bbcaff
| – || July 13 || 91st All-Star Game || AL 5–2 NL || Ohtani (1–0) || Burnes (0–1) || Hendriks (1) || 49,184 || 55–36 || N/A
|- style="background:#bfb;"
| 92 || July 16 || @ White Sox || 7–1 || McCullers Jr. (7–2) || Cease (7–5) || — || 34,516 || 56–36 || W2
|- style="background:#fbb;"
| 93 || July 17 || @ White Sox || 1–10 || Giolito (8–6) || Odorizzi (3–5) || — || 34,304 || 56–37 || L1
|- style="background:#fbb;"
| 94 || July 18 || @ White Sox || 0–4 || Rodón (8–3) || Valdez (5–2) || — || 34,148 || 56–38 || L2
|- style="background:#bfb;"
| 95 || July 19 || Indians || 4–3 || Greinke (9–3) || Mejía (1–5) || Pressly (17) || 21,963 || 57–38 || W1
|- style="background:#bfb;"
| 96 || July 20 || Indians || 9–3 || L. García (7–5) || McKenzie (1–4) || — || 26,586 || 58–38 || W2
|- style="background:#fbb;"
| 97 || July 21 || Indians || 4–5 || Shaw (3–3) || Pruitt (0–1) || Karinchak (11) || 21,712 || 58–39 || L1
|- style="background:#bfb;"
| 98 || July 23 || Rangers || 7–3 || Bielak (3–3) || Allard (2–8) || — || 38,853 || 59–39 || W1
|- style="background:#bfb;"
| 99 || July 24 || Rangers || 4–1 || Valdez (6–2) || Gibson (6–3) || — || 37,050 || 60–39 || W2
|- style="background:#bfb;"
| 100 || July 25 || Rangers || 3–1 || Greinke (10–3) || Santana (0–1) || Pressly (18) || 35,627 || 61–39 || W3
|- style="background:#fbb;"
| 101 || July 26 || @ Mariners || 8–11 || Graveman (4–0) || Stanek (1–2) || Sewald (4) || 15,162 || 61–40 || L1
|- style="background:#bfb;"
| 102 || July 27 || @ Mariners || 8–6 || McCullers Jr. (8–2) || Flexen (9–5) || — || 18,930 || 62–40 || W1
|- style="background:#bfb;"
| 103 || July 28 || @ Mariners || 11–4 || Odorizzi (4–5) || Kikuchi (6–6) || — || 18,908 || 63–40 || W2
|- style="background:#bfb;"
| 104 || July 30 || @ Giants || 9–6 || Valdez (7–2) || Gausman (9–5) || — || 28,020 || 64–40 || W3
|- style="background:#fbb;"
| 105 || July 31 || @ Giants || 6–8 || Jackson (2–0) || Taylor (2–3) || McGee (22) || 27,324 || 64–41 || L1
|-

|- style="background:#fbb;" 
| 106 || August 1 || @ Giants || 3–5 || Webb (5–3) || L. García (7–6) || McGee (23) || 29,655 || 64–42 || L2
|- style="background:#bfb;" 
| 107 || August 3 || @ Dodgers || 3–0 || McCullers Jr. (9–2) || Buehler (11–2) || Stanek (2) || 52,692 || 65–42 || W1
|- style="background:#fbb;" 
| 108 || August 4 || @ Dodgers || 5–7 || Scherzer (9–4) || Odorizzi (4–6) || — || 52,724 || 65–43 || L1
|- style="background:#fbb;" 
| 109 || August 5 || Twins || 3–5 || Jax (2–1) || Valdez (7–3) || Colomé (4) || 26,208 || 65–44 || L2
|- style="background:#fbb;" 
| 110 || August 6 || Twins || 4–5  || Minaya (2–0) || Montero (5–4) || — || 29,631 || 65–45 || L3
|- style="background:#bfb;" 
| 111 || August 7 || Twins || 4–0 || L. García (8–6) || Pineda (4–7) || — || 29,647 || 66–45 || W1
|- style="background:#fbb;" 
| 112 || August 8 || Twins || 5–7 || Maeda (5–4) || McCullers Jr. (9–3) || Colomé (5) || 26,825 || 66–46 || L1
|- style="background:#bfb;" 
| 113 || August 10 || Rockies || 5–0 || Odorizzi (5–6) || Gray (7–8) || — || 28,931 || 67–46 || W1
|- style="background:#bfb;" 
| 114 || August 11 || Rockies || 5–1 || Valdez (8–3) || Senzatela (2–9) || — || 22,200 || 68–46 || W2
|- style="background:#bfb;"
| 115 || August 13 || @ Angels || 4–1 || Greinke (11–3) || Sandoval (3–6) || Pressly (19) || 23,981 || 69–46 || W3
|- style="background:#bfb;" 
| 116 || August 14 || @ Angels || 8–2 || L. García (9–6) || Barría (2–1) || — || 27,121 || 70–46 || W4
|- style="background:#fbb;" 
| 117 || August 15 || @ Angels || 1–3 || Detmers (1–2) || McCullers Jr. (9–4) || Iglesias (26) || 19,281 || 70–47 || L1
|- style="background:#fbb;"  
| 118 || August 16 || @ Royals || 6–7 || Barlow (5–3) || Y. García (3–8) || — || 10,228 || 70–48 || L2
|- style="background:#fbb;" 
| 119 || August 17 || @ Royals || 1–3 || Lynch (3–3) || Valdez (8–4) || Brentz (2) || 9,748 || 70–49 || L3
|- style="background:#fbb;" 
| 120 || August 18 || @ Royals || 2–3 || Tapia (1–0) || Taylor (2–4)|| Barlow (7) || 12,278 || 70–50 || L4
|- style="background:#bfb;" 
| 121 || August 19 || @ Royals || 6–3  || Pressly (5–1) || Davis (0–3) || Javier (2) || 9,884 || 71–50 || W1
|- style="background:#bfb;" 
| 122 || August 20 || Mariners || 12–3 || McCullers Jr. (10–5) || Kikuchi (7–7) || — || 26,899 || 72–50 || W2
|- style="background:#bfb;" 
| 123 || August 21 || Mariners || 15–1 || Odorizzi (6–6) || Gilbert (5–5) || — || 29,908 || 73–50 || W3
|- style="background:#fbb;" 
| 124 || August 22 || Mariners || 3–6  || Sewald (8–3) || Stanek (1–3) || Ramírez (1) || 27,526 || 73–51 || L1
|- style="background:#fbb;"
| 125 || August 23 || Royals || 1–7 || Lynch (4–3) || Greinke (11–4) || — || 18,742 || 73–52 || L2
|- style="background:#bfb;" 
| 126 || August 24 || Royals || 4–0 || L. García (10–6) || Singer (3–9) || — || 22,964 || 74–52 || W1
|- style="background:#bfb;" 
| 127 || August 25 || Royals || 6–5  || Graveman (5–0) || Payamps (0–3) || — || 21,052 || 75–52 || W2
|- style="background:#bfb;" 
| 128 || August 27 || @ Rangers || 5–4 || Maton (3–0) || Martin (3–4) || Pressly (20) || 29,286 || 76–52 || W3
|- style="background:#bfb;" 
| 129 || August 28 || @ Rangers || 5–2 || Valdez (9–4) || Allard (3–11) || Pressly (21) || 37,810 || 77–52 || W4
|- style="background:#fbb;" 
| 130 || August 29 || @ Rangers || 2–13 || Hearn (4–4) || Greinke (11–5) || — || 31,062 || 77–53 || L1
|- style="background:#bfb;" 
| 131 || August 30 || @ Mariners || 4–3 || Maton (4–0) || Smith (2–3) || Pressly (22) || 11,630 || 78–53 || W1
|- style="background:#fbb;" 
| 132 || August 31 || @ Mariners || 0–4 || Sewald (9–3) || Graveman (5–1) || — || 10,452 || 78–54 || L1
|-

|- style="background:#fbb;" 
| 133 || September 1 || @ Mariners || 0–1 || Sheffield (6–8) || Odorizzi (6–7) || Sewald (8) || 10,519 || 78–55 || L2
|- style="background:#bfb;" 
| 134 || September 3 || @ Padres || 6–3 || Taylor (3–4) || Pagán (4–1) || Pressly (23) || 37,033 || 79–55 || W1
|- style="background:#fbb;"  
| 135 || September 4 || @ Padres || 2–10 || Musgrove (10–8) || Valdez (9–5) || — || 35,338 || 79–56 || L1
|- style="background:#fbb;" 
| 136 || September 5 || @ Padres || 3–4 || Melancon (4–2) || Stanek (1–4) || — || 35,007 || 79–57 || L2
|- style="background:#bfb;" 
| 137 || September 6 || Mariners || 11–2 || McCullers Jr. (11–4) || Kikuchi (7–8) || Bielak (1) || 25,802 || 80–57 || W1
|- style="background:#bfb;" 
| 138 || September 7 || Mariners || 5–4  || Stanek (2–4) || Ramírez (1–3) || — || 20,353 || 81–57 || W2
|- style="background:#fbb;" 
| 139 || September 8 || Mariners || 5–8 || Castillo (3–5) || Pressly (5–2) || — || 19,089 || 81–58 || L1
|- style="background:#bfb;" 
| 140 || September 10 || Angels || 10–5 || Valdez (10–5) || Ohtani (9–2) || — || 28,740 || 82–58 || W1
|- style="background:#fbb;" 
| 141 || September 11 || Angels || 2–4 || Suárez (7–7) || L. García (10–7) || Iglesias (31) || 31,547 || 82–59 || L1
|- style="background:#bfb;" 
| 142 || September 12 || Angels || 3–1 || McCullers Jr. (12–4) || Quijada (0–1) || Pressly (24) || 28,763 || 83–59 || W1
|- style="background:#bfb;" 
| 143 || September 13 || @ Rangers || 15–1 || Javier (4–1) || Howard (0–4) || — || 18,903 || 84–59 || W2
|- style="background:#fbb;" 
| 144 || September 14 || @ Rangers || 1–8 || Lyles (9–11) || Greinke (11–6) || — || 19,451 || 84–60 || L1
|- style="background:#bfb;" 
| 145 || September 15 || @ Rangers || 7–2 || Urquidy (7–3) || Arihara (2–4) || — || 20,991 || 85–60 || W1
|- style="background:#bfb;" 
| 146 || September 16 || @ Rangers || 12–1 || García (11–7) || Otto (0–2) || — || 19,121 || 86–60 || W2
|- style="background:#bfb;" 
| 147 || September 17 || Diamondbacks || 4–3  || Stanek (3–4) || Clippard (1–1) || — || 22,595 || 87–60 || W3
|- style="background:#fbb;" 
| 148 || September 18 || Diamondbacks || 4–6  || Wendelken (3–2) || Y. García (3–9) || Clippard (6) || 25,314 || 87–61 || L1
|- style="background:#bfb;" 
| 149 || September 19 || Diamondbacks || 7–6 || Solomon (1–0) || Sittinger (0–1) || Pressly (25) || 23,888 || 88–61 || W1
|- style="background:#bfb;" 
| 150 || September 20 || @ Angels || 10–0 || Valdez (11–5) || Barría (2–4) || — || 16,070 || 89–61 || W2
|- style="background:#bfb;" 
| 151 || September 21 || @ Angels || 10–5 || Urquidy (8–3) || Naughton (0–3) || — || 18,332 || 90–61 || W3
|- style="background:#bfb;"
| 152 || September 22 || @ Angels || 9–5  || Y. García (4–9) || Selman (0–1) || — || 14,863 || 91–61 || W4
|- style="background:#fbb;" 
| 153 || September 23 || @ Angels || 2–3 || Warren (2–0) || McCullers Jr. (12–5) || Iglesias (33) || 19,829 || 91–62 || L1
|- style="background:#fbb;" 
| 154 || September 24 || @ Athletics || 2–14 || Montas (13–9) || Bielak (3–4) || — || 21,105 || 91–63 || L2
|- style="background:#fbb;"
| 155 || September 25 || @ Athletics || 1–2 || Chafin (2–3) || Pressly (5–3) || — || 13,037 || 91–64 || L3
|- style="background:#fbb;" 
| 156 || September 26 || @ Athletics || 3–4 || Trivino (7–7) || Stanek (3–5) || — || 12,288 || 91–65 || L4
|- style="background:#bfb;"
| 157 || September 28 || Rays || 4–3 || Maton (5–0) || Fleming (10–7) || — || 32,297 || 92–65 || W1
|- style="background:#fbb;" 
| 158 || September 29 || Rays || 0–7 || Rasmussen (4–1) || García (11–8) || — || 28,321 || 92–66 || L1
|- style="background:#bfb;" 
| 159 || September 30 || Rays || 3–2 || McCullers Jr. (13–5) || Yarbrough (9–7) || Pressly (26) || 31,608 || 93–66 || W1
|-

|- style="background:#fbb;" 
| 160 || October 1 || Athletics || 6–8 || Manaea (11–10) || Valdez (11–6) || Trivino (22) || 26,672 || 93–67 || L1
|- style="background:#bfb;" 
| 161 || October 2 || Athletics || 10–4 || Maton (6–0) || Blackburn (1–4) || — || 29,208 || 94–67 || W1
|- style="background:#bfb;" 
| 162 || October 3 || Athletics || 7–6 || Taylor (4–4) || Trivino (7–8) || — || 29,752 || 95–67 || W2
|-

Postseason

Game log

|- style="background:#bfb;"
| 1 || October 7 || White Sox || 6–1 || McCullers Jr. (1–0) || Lynn (0–1) || — || 40,497 || 1–0 || W1
|- style="background:#bfb;"
| 2 || October 8 || White Sox || 9–4 || Stanek (1–0) || Bummer (0–1) || — || 41,315 || 2–0 || W2
|- style="background:#fbb;" 
| 3 || October 10 || @ White Sox || 6–12 || Kopech (1–0) || Y. García (0–1) || — || 40,288 || 2–1 || L1
|- style="background:#bbb;" 
| — || October 11 || @ White Sox || colspan=7| Postponed (rain, makeup October 12)
|- style="background:#bfb;" 
| 4 || October 12 || @ White Sox || 10–1 || Y. García (1–1) || Rodón (0–1) || — || 40,170 || 3–1 || W1
|-

|- style="background:#bfb;"
| 1 || October 15 || Red Sox || 5–4 || Stanek (1–0) || Robles (0–1) || Pressly (1) || 40,534 || 1–0 || W1
|- style="background:#fbb;" 
| 2 || October 16 || Red Sox || 5–9 || Eovaldi (1–0) || L. García (0–1) || — || 41,476 || 1–1 || L1
|- style="background:#fbb;" 
| 3 || October 18 || @ Red Sox || 3–12 || Rodríguez (1–0) || Urquidy (0–1) || — || 37,603 || 1–2 || L2
|- style="background:#bfb;" 
| 4 || October 19 || @ Red Sox || 9–2 || Graveman (1–0) || Eovaldi (1–1) || — || 38,010 || 2–2 || W1
|- style="background:#bfb;"
| 5 || October 20 || @ Red Sox || 9–1 || Valdez (1–0) || Sale (0–1) || — || 37,599 || 3–2 || W2
|- style="background:#bfb;" 
| 6 || October 22 || Red Sox || 5–0 || L. García (1–1) || Eovaldi (1–2) || — || 42,718 || 4–2 || W3
|-

|- style="background:#fbb;" 
| 1 || October 26 || Braves || 2–6 || Minter (1–0) || Valdez (0–1) || — || 42,825 || 0–1 || L1
|- style="background:#bfb;" 
| 2 || October 27 || Braves || 7–2 || Urquidy (1–0) || Fried (0–1) || — || 42,833 || 1–1 || W1
|- style="background:#fbb;" 
| 3 || October 29 || @ Braves || 0–2 || Anderson (1–0) || L. García (0–1) || Smith (1) || 42,898 || 1–2 || L1
|- style="background:#fbb;" 
| 4 || October 30 || @ Braves || 2–3 || Matzek (1–0) || Javier (0–1) || Smith (2) || 43,125 || 1–3 || L2
|- style="background:#bfb;" 
| 5 || October 31 || @ Braves || 9–5 || Urquidy (2–0) || Minter (1–1) || — || 43,122 || 2–3 || W1
|- style="background:#fbb;" 
| 6 || November 2 || Braves || 0–7 || Fried (1–1) || L. García (0–2) || — || 42,868 || 2–4 || L1
|-

American League Division Series (ALDS) vs. Chicago White Sox

The Astros played the Chicago White Sox in the ALDS.  The managers of the two clubs—Dusty Baker of the Astros and Tony La Russa of the White Sox—had faced each other over 200 times previously as managers of other major league clubs.  This series capped a historic rivalry in two intertwining professional baseball careers of which both spanned more than 50 years.

Game 1 at Minute Maid Park
The Astros started Lance McCullers Jr., while the White Sox started Lance Lynn. The Astros got the scoring started with a line drive single off the bat of rookie center fielder Jake Meyers. The Astros tacked on two more runs in the third on a Alex Bregman fielders choice and a Yordan Álvarez double that made it 3–0 Astros. Michael Brantley added on to the lead with a two run single to make it 5–0. Álvarez added a solo homer to cap the scoring for Houston as McCullers would pitch  innings of scoreless ball. The White Sox would get on the board in the 8th inning on a José Abreu single that made it 6–1 before Astros closer Ryan Pressly shut the door in the 9th inning to seal the Game 1 victory for the Astros.

Game 2 at Minute Maid Park
The Astros started Framber Valdez, while the White Sox started Lucas Giolito. The White Sox got the scoring started with a fielder's choice RBI from Eloy Jiménez. The Astros took the lead in the bottom of the 2nd with an RBI single from Kyle Tucker and a Chas McCormick sacrifice fly made it 2–1 Astros. The White Sox would storm back in the 5th, on RBI singles from Luis Robert & José Abreu and a sac fly from Yasmani Grandal. The Astros would tie it in the bottom half of the 5th from a 2 run single from AL batting champion Yuli Gurriel. The Astros would blow it open in the 7th off relievers Aaron Bummer and Craig Kimbrel, with Yordan Álvarez driving in José Altuve, Carlos Correa driving in both Alex Bregman and Yordan Álvarez before Tucker hit a 2 run home run to left to cap off the scoring. Astros relievers Ryan Pressly and Kendall Graveman each worked scoreless innings to seal the Game 2 win and give the Astros a 2–0 lead heading to Guaranteed Rate Field for Game 3.

Game 3 at Guaranteed Rate Field
The Astros started Luis García, while the White Sox started Dylan Cease. The White Sox once again got on the board first with an Eloy Jiménez RBI single. The Astros would strike back in the 2nd on a Kyle Tucker RBI double and a Jake Meyers RBI single. Tucker hit his 2nd homer of the series to make it 5–1 in the 3rd. The White Sox would answer with 5 runs in the bottom of the third. Yasmani Grandal hit a 2 run homer and Leury García hit a go ahead three run home run. The Astros would tie in the top of the 4th on a Alex Bregman RBI single. The White Sox would put up 3 in the bottom of the 4th on RBI singles from José Abreu, Eloy Jiménez along with a fielder's choice RBI off the bat of Grandal to make it 9–6 Chicago. Andrew Vaughn would come off the bench and double in Yoan Moncada, García would double in Vaughn and Anderson would single in Garcia to make it 12–6. That would be the end of scoring and White Sox closer Liam Hendriks would shut the door to send the series to a Game 4.

Game 4 at Guaranteed Rate Field
The Astros started Game 1 starter Lance McCullers Jr., while the White Sox started Carlos Rodón. The game was postponed on October 11 and was moved to October 12th. The White Sox again got the scoring started with a solo homer from rookie Gavin Sheets.  Center fielder Jake Meyers sustained an injury to his left shoulder while attempting to catch Sheets' home run ball on the fly.  He exited the game and was replaced by Chas McCormick.  The Astros took the lead in the 3rd on an RBI double from Carlos Correa.  The Astros scored three more runs in the fourth on an RBI single from Martín Maldonado and an RBI double from Alex Bregman.  Another run scored for Houston as Michael Brantley drove in McCormick, and they tacked on another run on an RBI single from Brantley that scored José Altuve.  Altuve broke the game open with a three-run homer off White Sox closer Liam Hendriks.  Astros closer Ryan Pressly would allow a single to Eloy Jiménez but shut the door afterwards to send Houston to their fifth straight ALCS.

American League Championship Series vs. Boston Red Sox

This was Houston's fifth straight ALCS appearance. The Astros faced the Boston Red Sox in a rematch of the 2018 ALCS, which the Astros lost in five games. With home field advantage in the series, the Astros started game 1 at home, where Altuve and Correa played their 65th career postseason game together. It was the most for a second baseman/shortstop duo in MLB history (this was also in addition to Altuve-Bregman-Correa-Gurriel being the most experienced playoff quartet with 61 games). The Astros won the ALCS in game six, advancing to their third World Series appearance in five years.

Game 1 at Minute Maid Park
The Astros started Framber Valdez, while the Red Sox started Chris Sale. The Astros got on the board first with a sacrifice fly from Yordan Álvarez. The Red Sox would respond with a game tying home run from Kiké Hernández, a fielders choice RBI from J. D. Martinez and a RBI double from Hunter Renfroe before knocking Valdez out of the game after . Sale would last only  as well before being pulled. The Astros would tie it on Altuve's 20th career postseason home run, tying him with Hall of Famer and Yankees former captain Derek Jeter. The Astros would retake the lead on a solo homer from Carlos Correa before adding another run on a sac fly in the 8th. Hernández hit another homer off Astros closer Ryan Pressly before Pressly shut the door to seal the 5–4 Game 1 win for Houston.

Game 2 at Minute Maid Park
The Astros started Luis García, while the Red Sox started Nathan Eovaldi. The Red Sox got things started with a grand slam from DH J.D. Martinez. The Red Sox would add another slam in the 2nd to make it 8–0 as Luis García left the game with a right knee injury. Kiké Hernández would add another run on a home run off Jake Odorizzi. The Astros would add three runs in the 4th off starter Nathan Eovaldi with an RBI double from Kyle Tucker and an RBI single from Yuli Gurriel. The Astros would tack on two more runs with homers from Gurriel and Jason Castro before the Red Sox sealed the win, 9–5.

Game 3 at Fenway Park
On the mound, the Astros started right-hander José Urquidy, while the Red Sox started right-hander Eduardo Rodríguez.  The Astros' starting infield consisted of Yuli Gurriel, José Altuve, Alex Bregman, and Carlos Correa, who established an MLB postseason record with four teammates starting their 64th postseason game together.  The Red Sox scored first with RBIs from Christian Vázquez and Christian Arroyo before Kyle Schwarber hit Boston's third grand slam to break it open at 6–0, knocking Urquidy out of the game.  Vázquez would add another run on an RBI single before Arroyo hit a 2-run homer to make it 9–0 after 3 innings. The Astros got on the board on a 3-run homer from Kyle Tucker. The Red Sox would add three more runs on a 2-run homer from J.D. Martinez and a solo homer from Rafael Devers before Hirokazu Sawamura shut the door to seal the 12–3 win for the Red Sox.

Game 4 at Fenway Park
The Astros started Zack Greinke, while the Red Sox countered with Nick Pivetta.  The Astros got on the board first with a solo homer from Alex Bregman in the top of the 1st. The Red Sox responded immediately with a 2-run homer from Xander Bogaerts in the bottom of the 1st.  No other scoring occurred until the top of the eighth inning, when José Altuve tied the game with a leadoff homer.  The Astros batted a total of 12 times in the ninth inning, with Correa leading the frame off with a double.  On the hill for Boston to attempt to hold the contest at a 2–2 tie was Eovaldi, typically their number-one starting pitcher.  Eovaldi struck out Kyle Tucker, then intentionally walked Yuli Gurriel, which brought Chas McCormick's spot to bat.  Baker opted to pinch hit for McCormick with Aledmys Díaz, whom Eovaldi also struck out.  Jason Castro next batted for Maldonado, and with a 1–2 count, umpire Laz Díaz called a slow curveball on that appeared to find the outside corner for a ball.  After a foul ball, Castro singled on split-finger fastball to score Correa, putting the Astros back on top, 3–2.  Next, Altuve worked a full-count walk to load the bases, leading Cora to remove Eovaldi for Martín Pérez.  Michael Brantley greeted Pérez' first pitch–a fastball–with a double to clear the bases and increase the score to 6–2. Yordan Álvarez singled in Brantley to make it 7–2 and Correa and Tucker both followed with RBI singles to make it 9–2.  The seven runs scored tied the postseason record for runs scored in a ninth inning.  Astros closer Ryan Pressly allowed two singles in the 9th inning but allowed neither baserunner to score, securing the Game 4 win for the Astros and knot up the ALCS at 2 games apiece.

Game 5 at Fenway Park
The ALCS Game 5 featured a rematch of Game 1 starters: Framber Valdez for the Astros, and Chris Sale for the Red Sox.  Houston scored first with an solo home run from Yordan Álvarez over the Green Monster.  Valdez did not allow a Boston baserunner until the fifth inning. The Astros scored five runs in the top of the sixth, chasing Sale with one out.  Álvarez doubled home two more runs to make it 3–0, then Yuli Gurriel doubled home Álvarez; rookie outfielder José Siri singled home Kyle Tucker and Gurriel to cap a five-run 6th inning.  Both Álvarez and Gurriel collected three hits and three RBI; all of Álvarez' hits landed to the opposite field.  This marked the first occasion in Álvarez' career in which he had produced at least three opposite-field hits; meanwhile Sale had allowed four total hits in 2021 to left-handed batters in  IP.  Michael Brantley hit an RBI single in the seventh to up the score to 7–0.  Rafael Devers got Boston on the board with a solo home run versus Valdez in the bottom of the 7th.  Gurriel drove in two more in the 9th to make it 9–1.  Valdez went eight innings and got the win, limiting Boston to three total hits and one walk while striking out five; he is the seventh visiting pitcher to go at least eight innings while allowing a run or fewer at Fenway Park in the postseason and the first since Charles Nagy in 1998.  Ryne Stanek shut the door in the 9th seal the Game 5 win and send the series back to Houston with the Astros up 3 games to 2.

Game 6 at Minute Maid Park
The ALCS Game 6 featured a rematch of Game 2 starters Luis Garcia for the Astros and Nathan Eovaldi for the Red Sox.  The Astros got on the board first with an RBI double deep to center field from Yordan Álvarez.  Kiké Hernández appeared to be in position to catch Álvarez' batted ball, but the ball bounced off his arm just below the glove and dropped to the ground for the two-base hit.  Garcia allowed no hits until the sixth inning, when Hernández tripled with two outs.  Baker removed Garcia, who left to a standing ovation from the fans.  His  no-hit innings equaled Brandon Backe's club record for a postseason contest; Backe also started with  no-hit innings in the 2004 NLDS.  The Astros got another run in the sixth on a double play that scored Álvarez from 3rd to make it 2–0 Houston.  In the seventh, Boston encountered their best chance to score with runners at first and third and one out following Alex Verdugo's single.  Kendall Graveman struck out pinch-hitter Travis Shaw; at that instant, Maldonado threw perfectly to Carlos Correa, covering second, to catch Verdugo attempting to steal for an inning-ending double play.  Kyle Tucker added insurance runs in the eighth with a three-run home run off reliever Adam Ottavino.  Ryan Pressly closed the game in the ninth to defeat the Red Sox, 5–0, capturing the Astros' third pennant in the last five seasons.

The ALCS win brought Baker his first AL pennant.  Thus, Baker became the ninth manager in major league history to win a pennant in both the American and National Leagues, having first won in 2002.

Origins of the Astros' pennant-winning roster
Having reached the World Series for the third time in five seasons, just six players remained from the 2017 World Series winner; of the six, two did not play in the 2021 ALCS: Lance McCullers Jr and Marwin González.
 Homegrown, international signings:
 José Altuve, 2007
 Framber Valdez, 2015
 José Urquidy, 2015
 Cristian Javier, 2015
 Luis García, 2017
 Homegrown, amateur draft:
 Jason Castro, 2008–10th overall pick
 Carlos Correa, 2012–1st overall pick
 Alex Bregman, 2015–2nd overall pick
 Kyle Tucker, 2015–5th overall pick
 Jake Meyers, 2017–13th round and 391st pick
 Chas McCormick, 2017–21st round and 631st pick

World Series vs. Atlanta Braves

This World Series appearance marked Houston's third World Series appearance in five years and fourth World Series appearance overall.

Game 1 at Minute Maid Park
Game 1 of the World Series featured a matchup of Charlie Morton, who pitched for the Astros in 2017 and 2018 before leaving in free agency, for the Braves against Framber Valdez for the Astros. The Braves got the scoring started with a leadoff home run from Jorge Soler and Austin Riley doubled in Ozzie Albies. Soler drove in his 2nd run of the game on a fielder's choice RBI. Adam Duvall would add a 2-run home run to make it 5–0 Atlanta. Morton would leave the game after  after taking a comebacker to his ankle in the 2nd inning, which fractured his right fibula and ruled Morton out for the rest of the series. The Astros would get a run in the 4th after an error from shortstop Dansby Swanson. The Braves would get another run in the 8th on Freddie Freeman sac fly. The Astros would tack on a run in the 8th as well on a RBI groundout from Carlos Correa. Braves closer Will Smith would walk Aledmys Díaz before shutting the door to seal the Game 1 win for Atlanta, 6–2.

Game 2 at Minute Maid Park
Game 2 featured a matchup of Max Fried for the Braves and José Urquidy for the Astros. The Astros got on the board first with an Alex Bregman sac fly that scored José Altuve. The Braves would respond in the top of the 2nd with a solo homer from catcher Travis d'Arnaud. The Astros would tack on four runs in the bottom of the 2nd with RBI singles from rookie outfielder José Siri, catcher Martín Maldonado and veteran outfielder Michael Brantley. Freddie Freeman would drive in his 2nd RBI of the series with an RBI single that made it 5–2 Houston. The Astros would tack on a run in the 6th on an fielder's choice error. Altuve would add another run on his 22nd career postseason home run, tying him for 2nd place on the all time postseason home run leaderboard with Bernie Williams. Kendall Graveman would shut the door in the 9th to tie the series at 1 game apiece heading to Atlanta for Game 3.

Game 3 at Truist Park
Game 3 featured a matchup of rookie right hander Luis García, while Atlanta went with right hander Ian Anderson.  The Braves held the Astros hitless for the first seven innings until Aledmys Díaz hit a single to right field in the eighth inning to end the Braves' no-hit bid.  The Astros managed just one more hit as the Braves won, 2–0, to take a 2–1 Series lead.

Game 4 at Truist Park
The Braves opted for a bullpen game in Game 4, starting the left-hander Dylan Lee. The Astros went with right-hander Zack Greinke. Houston scored the first run of the game in the top of the first inning when Carlos Correa drove in Jose Altuve. Altuve would add to the lead with a solo home run off of Kyle Wright in the fourth, passing Bernie Williams for second all time on the postseason home runs list. The Braves would not get on the board until the sixth, when Austin Riley drove in Eddie Rosario against reliever Phil Maton. In the seventh inning, the Braves’ Dansby Swanson stepped up and hit a game-tying solo home run off reliever Cristian Javier. Jorge Soler came off the bench and proceeded to follow up Dansby Swanson's homer with one of his own, this one giving Atlanta the lead. Tyler Matzek pitched a scoreless top of the eighth, aided by a great catch by Eddie Rosario robbing Jose Altuve of extra bases. Will Smith recorded his second save of the series, and the Braves moved win away from a World Series title.

Game 5 at Truist Park
The Astros started Framber Valdez, while the Braves went with another bullpen game, starting Tucker Davidson. The Braves started off strong with a first inning grand slam by Adam Duvall. The Astros got an RBI double from Alex Bregman and a sac fly by Martin Maldonado to make it 4-2. In the top of the third, an RBI double by Carlos Correa and a sacrifice groundout by Yuli Gurriel made it a tie game at 4-4. Freddie Freeman put the Braves back up with a 460-foot home run into right field. In the fifth, with two on base, Braves reliever A.J. Minter intentionally walked Alex Bregman. Maldonado came up and drew a bases loaded walk to tie the game. He was followed by pinch-hitter Marwin González, who drove in two more with a single. In the top of the 7th, Maldonado tacked on his third RBI of the night with a double that scored Kyle Tucker. In the eighth, the Astros got one more on an RBI double by Carlos Correa, his second of the night. Kendall Graveman pitched a scoreless eighth and ninth to secure the 9-5 victory for Houston and force Game 6.

Game 6 at Minute Maid Park
The Astros started Luis García, while the Braves sent Max Fried to the mound. The Braves took a 3–0 lead in the top of the third inning on a single and walk followed by a towering two-out home run by Jorge Soler that left Minute Maid Park over the raised train tracks in left field. Garcia exited after Soler's home run, having pitched  innings while striking out three batters. In the top of the fifth, a two-run home run by Dansby Swanson followed by a walk then a two-out double by Freddie Freeman extended Atlanta's lead to 6–0. In the top of the seventh, Freeman hit a solo home run with two outs to make it 7–0. Tyler Matzek entered in relief in the bottom of the seventh; Fried allowed no runs on four hits while striking out six batters and walking none in six innings. Atlanta closer Will Smith was brought in to pitch the bottom of the ninth. He allowed a leadoff single to Michael Brantley and retired the next three batters, the last out being a Yuli Gurriel infield grounder fielded by Swanson, who threw to Freeman, giving the Braves the title. With this final inning, Will Smith finished off a postseason in which he closed 11 of 16 Braves games while allowing no runs. Jorge Soler won the World Series Most Valuable Player Award.

With the World Series victory, Joc Pederson became a back-to-back World Series winner on two different teams, joining names like Jack Morris, Ryan Theriot, Jake Peavy and Ben Zobrist who previously accomplished that feat. Pederson had become a fan-favorite throughout his three-month stay in Atlanta, particularly for his preference to wear pearls.

Postseason rosters

| style="text-align:left" | 
Pitchers: 21 Zack Greinke 31 Kendall Graveman 43 Lance McCullers Jr. 45 Ryne Stanek 53 Cristian Javier 55 Ryan Pressly 58 Brooks Raley 59 Framber Valdez 65 José Urquidy 77 Luis García 88 Phil Maton 93 Yimi García 
Catchers: 11 Garrett Stubbs 15 Martín Maldonado 18 Jason Castro 
Infielders: 1 Carlos Correa 2 Alex Bregman 10 Yuli Gurriel 16 Aledmys Díaz 27 José Altuve
Outfielders: 6 Jake Meyers 20 Chas McCormick 23 Michael Brantley 26 José Siri 30 Kyle Tucker
Designated hitters: 44 Yordan Álvarez 
|- valign="top"

| style="text-align:left" | 
Pitchers: 17 Jake Odorizzi 21 Zack Greinke 31 Kendall Graveman 45 Ryne Stanek 53 Cristian Javier 55 Ryan Pressly 58 Brooks Raley 59 Framber Valdez 62 Blake Taylor 65 José Urquidy 77 Luis García 88 Phil Maton 93 Yimi García
Catchers: 15 Martín Maldonado 18 Jason Castro 
Infielders: 1 Carlos Correa 2 Alex Bregman 10 Yuli Gurriel 16 Aledmys Díaz 27 José Altuve
Outfielders: 6 Jake Meyers 20 Chas McCormick 23 Michael Brantley 26 José Siri 30 Kyle Tucker
Designated hitters: 44 Yordan Álvarez
|- valign="top"

| style="text-align:left" | 
Pitchers: 17 Jake Odorizzi 21 Zack Greinke 31 Kendall Graveman 45 Ryne Stanek 53 Cristian Javier 55 Ryan Pressly 58 Brooks Raley 59 Framber Valdez 62 Blake Taylor 65 José Urquidy 77 Luis García 88 Phil Maton 93 Yimi García
Catchers: 15 Martín Maldonado 18 Jason Castro
Infielders: 1 Carlos Correa 2 Alex Bregman 9 Marwin González 10 Yuli Gurriel 16 Aledmys Díaz 27 José Altuve
Outfielders: 20 Chas McCormick 23 Michael Brantley 26 José Siri 30 Kyle Tucker
Designated hitters: 44 Yordan Álvarez
|- valign="top"

Awards notes
For recognition of their defensive prowess, Rawlings Sporting Goods announced that the Houston Astros were the winners of the 2021 American League (AL) Gold Glove Team Award, the second iteration of the team-wide award, and Houston's first.  The Astros led the American League with +78 Defensive Runs Saved (DRS), second in MLB to only the St. Louis Cardinals with +86, the winners of the National League Gold Glove Team Award.  The Astros also led the AL with +45 outs above average (OAA), second in the major leagues to the Cardinals (+50). Shortstop Carlos Correa won his first career of both the Platinum Glove and Gold Glove Awards, marking the first time an Astros player has won a Platinum Glove.  Correa led the AL with +21 DRS in 2021.

Five Astros players were announced on October 25, 2021, as finalists for the Silver Slugger Award, including José Altuve, Yordan Álvarez, Correa, Yuli Gurriel, and Kyle Tucker.  However, all of the five were claimed by players on other teams, including Vladimir Guerrero Jr. of Toronto at first base, Marcus Semien of Toronto at second base, Xander Bogaerts of Boston at shortstop, Teoscar Hernández, Aaron Judge and Cedric Mullins in the outfield, and Shohei Ohtani at designated hitter.

Starting pitcher Luis García finished second to Randy Arozarena of Tampa Bay in the American League Rooke of the Year balloting, receiving two first-place votes 

Manager Dusty Baker was named as a finalist for AL Manager of the Year Award.  He finished third, garnering two first-place votes, five for second place, and eight for third place.  Kevin Cash of Tampa Bay was the winner.

Statistics

Batting

Regular season

Awards and achievements

Major League debuts and awards

AL batting leaders

AL pitching leaders

AL fielding leaders

Roster

Minor league system and first-year player draft

Teams

In advance of the 2021 season, Major League Baseball took direct control of, and restructured, Minor League Baseball in part with the intent of cost efficiency, and enhancing the experience and compensation for its players and directly managing their development plans.  The legacy league names were replaced with generic names depicting their level of play.  One significant change for Astros included aligning the Sugar Land Skeeters as their AAA club; the Skeeters were previously members of the Atlantic League of Professional Baseball and unaffiliated with any major league clubs.  Sugar Land replaced the Round Rock Express.

Major League Baseball draft

See also

 List of Major League Baseball batting champions
 List of Major League Baseball franchise postseason streaks

References
Footnotes

Sources

External links
Houston Astros season official site 
2021 Houston Astros season at Baseball Reference

Houston Astros seasons
Houston Astros
Houston Astros
American League West champion seasons
American League champion seasons